Whitefish Lake State Park is a  public recreation area on Whitefish Lake off of U.S. Highway 93, two miles northwest of Whitefish, Montana. It offers boating, swimming, tent and RV camping, and fishing. Sites for hike-in and bike-in camping were added in 2016.

References

External links
Whitefish Lake State Park Montana Fish Wildlife & Parks 
Whitefish Lake State Park Map Montana Fish Wildlife & Parks

State parks of Montana
Protected areas of Flathead County, Montana
Protected areas established in 1960
1960 establishments in Montana